Burstall is a surname. Notable people with the surname include:

Betty Burstall (1926–2013), Australian theatre director
Emma Burstall (born 1961), English author
Henry Edward Burstall (1870–1945), Canadian general
Rod Burstall (born 1934), British computer scientist 
Tim Burstall (1927–2004), Australian filmmaker
Sara Annie Burstall (1859–1939), educationalist